Emanuela Silimbani (born 26 April 1959) is an Italian former basketball player. She competed in the women's tournament at the 1980 Summer Olympics.

References

External links
 

1959 births
Living people
Italian women's basketball players
Olympic basketball players of Italy
Basketball players at the 1980 Summer Olympics
People from Faenza
Sportspeople from the Province of Ravenna